In enzymology, a N-hydroxythioamide S-beta-glucosyltransferase is an enzyme that catalyzes the chemical reaction

UDP-glucose + N-hydroxy-2-phenylethanethioamide  UDP + desulfoglucotropeolin

Thus, the two substrates of this enzyme are UDP-glucose and N-hydroxy-2-phenylethanethioamide, whereas its two products are UDP and desulfoglucotropeolin.

This enzyme belongs to the family of glycosyltransferases, specifically the hexosyltransferases.  The systematic name of this enzyme class is UDP-glucose:N-hydroxy-2-phenylethanethioamide S-beta-D-glucosyltransferase. Other names in common use include desulfoglucosinolate-uridine diphosphate glucosyltransferase, uridine diphosphoglucose-thiohydroximate glucosyltransferase, thiohydroximate beta-D-glucosyltransferase, UDPG:thiohydroximate glucosyltransferase, thiohydroximate S-glucosyltransferase, thiohydroximate glucosyltransferase, and UDP-glucose:thiohydroximate S-beta-D-glucosyltransferase.

References

 
 
 
 

EC 2.4.1
Enzymes of unknown structure